The Family Policy Studies Centre was a charity which carried out independent policy studies research and policy analysis on family issues and trends. It was based at the University of Oxford.

Its research included the understanding of contemporary family structures and patterns, the changes taking place, and the implications of such changes for policy and practice; the analysis of the impact of public policy decisions on families of different kinds.  The centre acted as a centre of information, dissemination and debate, and aimed to serve as a bridge between policy-makers, academics and practitioners.

It produced a range of publications aimed at a variety of audiences, many of which are still available on its website.

The centre closed at the end of April 2001, after twenty-three years, following funding difficulties.

External links
 Family Policy Studies Centre

Public policy think tanks based in the United Kingdom
Family in the United Kingdom